May Hariri is a Lebanese pop artist as well as an actress and the ex-wife of singer Melhem Barakat.

Discography

Studio albums 

 2002: Monawat
 2004: Hasahar Oyono
 2006: Habibe Inta
 2008: Omry Tani
2011:  Jani O Jani
2012:  Bhebak Ana Bejnoun
2015:  Bahwak
2016:  Nadmana

References

21st-century Lebanese women singers
1972 births
Living people
Lebanese Shia Muslims
People from South Lebanon